The 2014–15 Hong Kong FA Cup is the 40th season of Hong Kong FA Cup. It is a knockout competition for all the teams of the 2014–15 Hong Kong Premier League. Unlike the previous season, the format will change back into a single-legged competition.

It will once again feature lower division. 4 teams from the preliminary round will be qualified for the proper round.

The winner will guarantee a place in the 2014–15 Hong Kong Season Play-off.

Preliminary round

Teams that qualified for the proper round:
 Yau Tsim Mong
 Shatin
 Southern
 Citizen

Fixtures and results

First Round
First round features six teams from the Premier League and the four semi finalists from the Preliminary Round.

Quarter-finals

Semi-finals

Final

External links
FA Cup – Hong Kong Football Association

Fa Cup
Hong Kong FA Cup
2015